Simeulue Tengah (Central Simeulue) is a district of the Simeulue Regency on Simeulue island in the Indonesian province of Aceh.  At the 2010 Census it had a total population of 9,010 people, living in 1,930 households in 2005. Following the splitting off of eight desa / kelurahan to form a separate Simeulue Cut district in 2012, the reduced Simeulue Tengah District covers 112.48 km2 and had a population of 7,101 in 2014.

Administrative divisions
As at 2010, Simeulue Tengah was divided administratively into 24 desa / kelurahan. However in 2012 eight of these were removed from the regency to form a new regency of Simeulue Cut. The remaining sixteen desa / kelurahan are:

 Dihit
 Kampung Aie
 Kuta Batu
 Lakubang
 Lamayang
 Lambaya
 Latitik
 Lauke
 Lauree
 Luan Sorip
 Putra Jaya
 Sebee
 Situfa Jaya
 Suak Baru
 Wel Langkum
 Wel Wel

References

Districts of Aceh